The 1999 ECAC Hockey Men's Ice Hockey Tournament was the 38th tournament in league history. It was played between March 12 and March 20, 1999. Quarterfinal games were played at home team campus sites, while the final five games were played at the Olympic Arena (subsequently renamed Herb Brooks Arena) in Lake Placid, New York. By winning the tournament, Clarkson received the ECAC's automatic bid to the 1999 NCAA Division I Men's Ice Hockey Tournament.

Format
The tournament featured three rounds of play. The two teams that finish below tenth place in the standings are not eligible for tournament play. In the first round, the first and tenth seeds, the second and ninth seeds, the third seed and eighth seeds, the fourth seed and seventh seeds and the fifth seed and sixth seeds played a modified best-of-three series, where the first team to receive 3 points moves on, with the three highest-seeded winners advancing to the semifinals and the remaining two winners playing in the Four vs. Five matchup. After the opening round every series becomes a single-elimination game. In the semifinals, the highest seed plays the winner of the four vs. five game while the two remaining teams play with the winners advancing to the championship game and the losers advancing to the third place game. The tournament champion receives an automatic bid to the 1999 NCAA Men's Division I Ice Hockey Tournament.

Conference standings
Note: GP = Games played; W = Wins; L = Losses; T = Ties; PTS = Points; GF = Goals For; GA = Goals Against

Bracket
Teams are reseeded after the First Round

Note: * denotes overtime period(s)

First round

(1) Clarkson vs. (10) Brown

(2) St. Lawrence vs. (9) Vermont

(3) Rensselaer vs. (8) Harvard

(4) Princeton vs. (7) Cornell

(5) Yale vs. (6) Colgate

Four vs. Five

(4) Princeton vs. (6) Colgate

Semifinals

(1) Clarkson vs. (4) Princeton

(2) St. Lawrence vs. (3) Rensselaer

Third place

(3) Rensselaer vs. (4) Princeton

Championship

(1) Clarkson vs. (2) St. Lawrence

Tournament awards

All-Tournament Team
F Erik Cole (Clarkson)
F Dan Riva (Rensselaer)
F Jeff Halpern (Princeton)
D Willie Mitchell* (Clarkson)
D Justin Harney (St. Lawrence)
G Eric Heffler (St. Lawrence)
* Most Outstanding Player(s)

References

External links
ECAC Hockey

ECAC Hockey Men's Ice Hockey Tournament
ECAC tournament